The Wiener Internationale Gartenschau 74 (English: Vienna International Garden Show 74), often shortened to WIG 74, was a garden festival held in Vienna, Austria. Recognised by the Bureau International des Expositions, the Expo was the second international horticultural exposition to be held in Vienna under the auspices of the  AIPH. The plans for the Expo began to develop shortly after the closing of the WIG 64 held a decade earlier. Following the success of the 1964 exposition, the council was urged to re-organize a horticultural exhibition. An area on the south side of town that had once served as a recording field for silent films was ideally suited to create a large park. In 1969, architect Erich Hanke won an international design competition. He then formed several working groups of landscape architects from various countries, who made different designs for parts of the site. The best designs were incorporated into the grounds. A monorail was built to transport the visitors, but was eventually scrapped due to lack of success.

References

External links
 Official website of the BIE

International horticultural exhibitions
1974 in Austria
Events in Vienna
1974 festivals
Garden festivals in Austria
Festivals in Vienna